Raymond James Montgomery (born August 8, 1969) is an American professional baseball player and executive. He played in Major League Baseball (MLB) during three seasons for the Houston Astros. He is the bench coach for the Los Angeles Angels, and formerly served as the scouting director for the Milwaukee Brewers of MLB.

Playing career
Montgomery grew up in New York and was a fan of the New York Mets. He attended Archbishop Stepinac High School in White Plains, New York, and Fordham University. In 1989, he played collegiate summer baseball with the Chatham A's of the Cape Cod Baseball League. The Houston Astros selected Montgomery in the 13th round of the 1990 amateur draft. Montgomery played his first professional season with their Class A (Short Season) Auburn Astros in 1990, and his last with the New York Mets' Triple-A Norfolk Tides in 2001.

One of Ray Montgomery's career highlights came on July 24, 1996, against the San Diego Padres when he hit a walk off home run as a pinch hitter in the tenth inning to give the Astros the win, 6-4. The home run, hit off San Diego's Ron Villone, was the first major league home run for the rookie.

Executive career
After his playing career, he spent four years as an area scout for the Milwaukee Brewers, during which time Milwaukee selected second baseman Rickie Weeks out of his South Texas/Louisiana territory. He was the Brewers' Midwest supervisor for two years and their assistant scouting director and national supervisor the next two years. In 2009, Montgomery turned down an offer to become the scouting director of the San Diego Padres because he had just moved to Connecticut and did not want to relocate.

In 2010, the Arizona Diamondbacks named Montgomery their new scouting director.  He served four years in that role, until he returned to the Brewers as their scouting director in November 2014.

The Los Angeles Angels hired Montgomery as their director for player personnel after the 2020 season. After the 2021 season, the Angels named him their new bench coach.

Personal life
Both of Montgomery's parents died of lung cancer. His father died before the 1990 draft and his mother died later that decade.

Montgomery met his wife, Daniela, when they were both students at Fordham and married at Fordham on September 29, 1996. Their first child, a son, was born in late 2000.

References

External links

Venezuelan Winter League
"Ray Montgomery Home Run Video". "Rookie Ray Montgomery sends a game-winning two-run homer into the flowers" July 24, 1996

1969 births
Living people
Arizona Diamondbacks executives
Auburn Astros players
Baseball players from New York (state)
Burlington Astros players
Chatham Anglers players
Fordham Rams baseball players
Houston Astros players
Jackson Generals (Texas League) players
Major League Baseball outfielders
Major League Baseball scouting directors
Milwaukee Brewers executives
Milwaukee Brewers scouts
Nashville Sounds players
Navegantes del Magallanes players
American expatriate baseball players in Venezuela
New Orleans Zephyrs players
Norfolk Tides players
People from Bronxville, New York
Tucson Toros players
Archbishop Stepinac High School alumni
Los Angeles Angels executives
Los Angeles Angels coaches
Major League Baseball bench coaches